James Hamilton, 1st Earl of Abercorn PC (S) (1575–1618) was a Scottish diplomat for James VI and an undertaker in the Plantation of Ulster, Ireland.

Birth and origins 

James was born on 12 August 1575, probably at Paisley, Scotland, the eldest son of Claud Hamilton and his wife Margaret Seton. At that time his father was only a younger brother of James Hamilton, 3rd Earl of Arran, but he would on 24 July 1587 be created Lord Paisley. His paternal grandfather was James Hamilton, 2nd Earl of Arran in Scotland and Duke of Châtellerault in France. His father's family descended from Walter FitzGilbert, the founder of the House of Hamilton, who had received the barony of Cadzow from Robert the Bruce. 

James's mother was a daughter of George Seton, 7th Lord Seton. His parents had married in 1574 at Niddry Castle, West Lothian, Scotland. Both sides of the family were Scottish, Catholic, and supporters of Mary, Queen of Scots. His father and his father-in-law had both fought for her at Langside in 1568.

As eldest son he was given the courtesy title of Master of Paisley after the Scottish habit. George had four brothers and one sister, who are listed in his father's article.

Marriage and children 
Shortly before or in 1592, Master Paisley married Marion, daughter of Thomas Boyd, 6th Lord Boyd. Marion was a prominent Roman Catholic and would in 1628 be excommunicated by the synod of the Church of Scotland in Glasgow after his death.

 
James and Marion had nine children, five boys:
James (c. 1603 – c. 1670), succeeded as the 2nd Earl of Abercorn
 Claud (died 1638), established himself in Ireland
 William (died 1681), was created Baronet Hamilton of Westport and represented Henrietta Maria, Charles I's widow, at the pope
 George (c. 1608 – 1679), was created Baronet Hamilton of Donalong
 Alexander (died before 4 May 1669), founded the German branch of the family

—and four girls:
 Anne (1592–1620), married Hugh Sempill, 5th Lord Sempill in 1611
 Margaret (died 1642), married Sir William Cunninghame of Caprington
 Isobel (1600–1620)
 Lucy (born before 1618), for whom a marriage was arranged with Randal MacDonnell, 1st Marquess of Antrim, but the wedding never took place

Life in Scotland 
In 1597, Master Paisley sat for Linlithgow in the Parliament of Scotland. He was also made a Gentleman of the Bedchamber and a member of the Privy Council to James VI of Scotland. In 1600, the King created him hereditary Sheriff of Linlithgow.

On 24 March 1603 James VI also became King of England as James I and from there on reigned both kingdoms in personal union.

On 5 April 1603, Master Paisley was created Lord Abercorn, of Linlithgowshire. This made him the first of the long line of earls, then marquesses, and finally dukes of Abercorn.

His wife was a close friend of Anne of Denmark. In May 1603 Anne of Denmark came to Stirling Castle hoping to collect her son Prince Henry, who was in the keeping of the Earl of Mar. Anne fainted at dinner and when Jean Drummond and Marion Boyd, Mistress of Paisley, carried her to bed she had a miscarriage. The lawyer Thomas Haddington wrote an account of these events, and said the queen had told her physician Martin Schöner and the Mistress of Paisley that she had taken "some balm water that hastened her abort".

In 1604, Lord Abercorn, as he was now, served on a royal commission established to consider the union of the crowns of England and Scotland. Though the project failed, the king was content with his services. He received large grants of lands in Scotland.

On 10 July 1606 he was further honoured by being created Earl of Abercorn, Baron Paisley, Baron Hamilton, Baron Mountcastell, and Baron Kilpatrick. The family tree shows how the Abercorn title was inherited moving at the death of the 3rd Earl to the descendants of the 2nd son, Claud, and then at the death of the 5th Earl to the descendants of his 4th son, George.

Plantation of Ulster 
Lord Abercorn, as he was now, and his brothers Claud and George were undertakers in James I's Plantation of Ulster. He does not appear on the list of undertaker of 1609, but on the list of 1611 he is granted the great proportion of Donalong (2000 acres) and the small proportion of Strabane (1000 acres). He acquired the middle (medium-sized) proportion of Shean from Boyd at a later time. He was given pieces of land called Strabane, Donnalonge and Shean in County Tyrone that had been confiscated from the O'Neill clan. He built a castle at Strabane. His brother Claude, called "of Shawfield", was given land in County Cavan.

On 11 March 1613/4, he was summoned to attend the Parliament of Ireland and was granted the precedence of an earl in Ireland (confirmed by royal warrant on 31 March), although he had never been created a peer in that realm. He was appointed to the Council of Munster on 20 May 1615.

Death, succession, and timeline 
Lord Abercorn died on 23 March 1618, at Monkton, Ayrshire, Scotland, predeceasing his father and was buried on 29 April 1618 in Paisley Abbey church.

He predeceased his father by three years and therefore never became Lord Paisley, but, having been created Earl of Abercorn, he did not miss this title. His eldest son, James, aged 14, succeeded him as the 2nd Earl of Abercorn. His widow died in Edinburgh in 1632. His brother, Sir George Hamilton of Greenlaw and Roscrea, helped to bring up the children and to convert them to the Catholic religion.

Notes and references

Notes

Citations

Sources 

  – 1574 to 1581
 
 
 
 
 
  – Ab-Adam to Basing
  – (for timeline)
  – Viscounts
  – 1610 to 1613
 
 
  
  – Abercorn to Balmerino (for Abercorn)
  – Fife to Hyndford (for Walter FitzGilbert)
  – Panmure to Sinclair (for Sempill)
  – Sumerville to Winton
 

1575 births
1618 deaths
01
James
Members of the Parliament of Scotland 1617
Members of the Privy Council of Scotland
Peers of Scotland created by James VI
People associated with West Lothian
Scottish sheriffs